Buttermilk is an unincorporated community in Comanche County, Kansas, United States.

History
As of 2014, it consisted of a farmhouse and outbuildings, a church, and three houses.  It does not ordinarily appear on any road maps.

The nearby Big Gyp Cave Pictograph Site is on the National Register of Historic Places.

Education
The community is served by Comanche County USD 300 public school district.

References

Further reading

External links
 Comanche County maps: Current, Historic, KDOT

Unincorporated communities in Comanche County, Kansas
Unincorporated communities in Kansas